Ramón A. Nivar Martínez (born February 22, 1980 in San Cristobal, Dominican Republic) is a former Major League Baseball utility player who played for the Texas Rangers and Baltimore Orioles from 2003-2005.

Career
Nivar was original signed as an undrafted free agent by the Texas Rangers in 1998. In 2003 with the  Double-A Frisco RoughRiders, he hit .347 and was selected as Baseball America 2nd Team Minor League All-Star, Texas League All-Star Second Baseman and Texas League Minor League Player of the Year.  He also played for the World team in the  All-Star Futures Game.

Nivar made his Major League debut on July 30, 2003 for the Rangers against the Boston Red Sox as a  ninth inning defensive replacement. He played in 28 games with the Rangers that season, hitting .211 in 90 at bats. After playing in seven more games in 2004 he was traded to the Baltimore Orioles in March 2005, appearing in seven games with the Orioles that season.

Before 2006 Nivar signed a minor league contract with the St. Louis Cardinals but did not make the roster. He played some games for the independent York Revolution in 2007 and then signed a minor league contract with the San Diego Padres at the end of the season.

Nivar was released during 2008 spring training. He later played in the Can-Am League for the New Jersey Jackals and finished the season with for the Newark Bears of the Atlantic League, batting .327.

In 2009, Los Angeles Dodgers signed Nivar to a minor league contract and assigned him to Double-A Chattanooga Lookouts. On May 4, 2010 Ramon was promoted to triple-A Albequrque

Nivar is a career .223 hitter in 42 Major League games, including 13 runs, 12 RBI and five stolen bases without home runs.

External links

1980 births
Living people
Albuquerque Isotopes players
Baltimore Orioles players
Bowie Baysox players
Camden Riversharks players
Charlotte Rangers players
Chattanooga Lookouts players
Dominican Republic expatriate baseball players in Canada
Dominican Republic expatriate baseball players in the United States
Frisco RoughRiders players

Major League Baseball center fielders
Major League Baseball players from the Dominican Republic
New Jersey Jackals players
Newark Bears players
Oklahoma RedHawks players
Ottawa Lynx players
Savannah Sand Gnats players
Texas Rangers players
York Revolution players